Miroslav Škeřík (14 October 1924 – 11 January 2013) was a Czech professional basketball player. At 6'5 " (1.97 m) tall, he played the center position. He was the top scorer of EuroBasket 1955, averaging 19.1 points per game.

Club playing career
In his club career, Škeřík won 5 Czechoslovak League championships (1954, 1955, 1956, 1957, 1959).

National team career
Škeřík helped lead the senior Czechoslovakia national team to three EuroBasket silver medals in 1951, 1955, and 1959, as well as to a EuroBasket bronze medal in EuroBasket 1957. He was the Top scorer of EuroBasket 1955. He also represented Czechoslovakia in the Summer Olympic Games of 1952.

References

External links
 FIBA.com Profile
 Fibaeurope.com Profile

1924 births
2013 deaths
Basketball players at the 1952 Summer Olympics
Centers (basketball)
Czech men's basketball players
Czechoslovak men's basketball players
Olympic basketball players of Czechoslovakia
Sportspeople from Košice